Elections to Macclesfield Borough Council were held on 4 May 2006. One third of the council was up for election. In addition there was a by-election for the High Legh ward on the same day, where Charles Oulton (Conservative) was elected unopposed. The Conservative Party kept overall control of the council with a majority of 12 seats.  Overall turnout was 34.2%.

After the election, the composition of the council was:
Conservative 36
Liberal Democrat 13
Labour 6
Handforth Ratepayers 3
Independents 2

Results

Ward results

References
Macclesfield Borough Council election results

2006 English local elections
2006
2000s in Cheshire